The Alcohol laws of Tennessee are distinct in that they vary considerably by county.

Local government jurisdictions (counties & municipalities) in Tennessee by default are dry and do not allow the sales of liquor or wine. These governments must amend the laws to allow for liquor-by-the-drink sales and retail package stores. In many cases, the county may be dry, but a municipality is wet. The sale of beer is not affected by a dry or wet designation. This list may not reflect recent changes.

Dry counties
In a "dry County", the sale of alcohol and alcoholic beverages is prohibited or restricted – 5 out of Tennessee's 95 counties are completely dry.
Hancock County
Meigs County
Moore County (Despite being home to Jack Daniel's Distillery, Moore County itself had been completely dry.  However, the county now allows the sale of commemorative bottles of Jack in the White Rabbit Bottle Shop and one can take part in a sampling tour at the distillery.  It is also now possible to sample wine, rum, vodka and whiskey in shops where it is distilled on premises.  Beer is also available in local food establishments when served with a meal)
Morgan County 
Union County

Wet counties
The designation of a "wet county" applies to jurisdictions where the sale of alcohol and alcoholic beverages is permitted – 10 out of Tennessee's 95 counties are wet. The state's four largest cities, Memphis (Shelby), Nashville (Davidson), Knoxville (Knox), and Chattanooga (Hamilton), are located in "wet counties".
Cumberland County
Davidson County
Hamilton County
Knox County 
Loudon County
Polk County
Rutherford County
Shelby County
Sumner County
Williamson County

Moist counties
In a "moist county", the sale of alcohol and alcoholic beverages in certain jurisdictions is permitted. This designation applies to 80 out of Tennessee's 95 counties.
Anderson County permits both
Bedford County permits both
Benton County permits Retail package stores
Bledsoe County permits both
Blount County permits both
Bradley County liquor-by-the-drink ONLY
Campbell County permits both
Cannon County permits both
Carroll County Retail package stores
Carter County liquor-by-the-drink county-wide and retail package stores restricted to Elizabethton city limits (limited to three stores maximum) 
Cheatham County permits both
Chester County Retail package stores
Claiborne County Liquor-by-the-drink (New Tazewell) and wine in retail food stores (Tazewell)
Clay County Retail package stores
Cocke County permits both
Coffee County permits both
Crockett County Retail package stores in Alamo (2020 referendum)
DeKalb County Retail package stores
Decatur County Retail package stores (2022 referendum). Liquor-by-the-drink in restaurants with a dining capacity of 75 or greater within three miles of the Tennessee River
Dickson County permits both
Dyer County permits both
Fayette County permits both
Fentress County Retail package stores in Jamestown (2020 referendum)
Franklin County permits both
Gibson County permits both
Giles County permits both
Grainger County Liquor-by-the-drink in Blaine (2016 referendum)
Greene County Retail package stores
Grundy County Retail package stores
Hamblen County permits both
Hardeman County liquor-by-the-drink ONLY
Hardin County Retail package stores, Liquor-by-the-drink in restaurants with a dining capacity of 75 or greater within three miles of Tennessee River 
Hawkins County Retail package stores 
Haywood County liquor-by-the-drink ONLY
Henderson County Retail package stores ONLY (no liquor-by-the-drink), and only within the city limits of Lexington, new referendum passed September 8, 2011
Henry County permits both
Hickman County Retail package stores ONLY and only within the city limits of Centerville.  This is due to state law not allowing liquor stores in unincorporated areas.  Centerville is the only incorporated city in the county.
Houston County Retail package store in Erin (2014 referendum)
Humphreys County Retail package stores, Liquor-by-the-drink in Waverly (Referendum passed November 2016)
Jackson County Retail package stores
Jefferson County permits both
Johnson County permits both (2018 referendums)
Lake County Retail Package Store
Lauderdale County permits both
Lawrence County Retail package stores
Lewis County Retail Package Stores
Lincoln County permits both
Macon County Retail package store in Red Boiling Springs and Lafayette. Liquor-by-the-drink in Lafayette.
Madison County permits both
Marion County permits both
Marshall County permits both
Maury County permits both
McMinn County Full retail sales of liquor allowed on a community elective basis.
McNairy County permits both in Selmer ONLY (2015 referendum)
Montgomery County permits both
Monroe County permits both
Obion County liquor-by-the-drink ONLY
Overton County liquor-by-the-drink ONLY
Perry County Retail package stores
Pickett County Retail package store in Byrdstown
Putnam County permits both
Rhea County permits both
Roane County permits both
Robertson County permits both
Scott County both permitted in Winfield only, 
Sequatchie County permits both
Sevier County permits both
Smith County permits both
Stewart County Retail package stores (2022 refereendum)
Sullivan County permits both
Tipton County permits both
Trousdale County Retail package stores
Unicoi County Liquor-by-the-drink ONLY
Van Buren County Retail package stores
Warren County permits both
Washington County permits both
Wayne County Retail package stores in Clifton (2018 referendum) and liquor-by-the-drink in restaurants with a dining capacity of 75 or greater within three miles of Tennessee River
Weakley County Liquor-by-the-drink ONLY
White County Liquor-by-the-drink ONLY
Wilson County permits both

Distilleries

By 1810, registered distilleries numbered 14,191 and were producing 25.5 million gallons of whiskey. In 2009, the Tennessee General Assembly amended the statute that had for many years limited the distillation of drinkable spirits to just three counties (Lincoln, Moore, and Coffee). The revised law allows distilleries to be established in 41 additional counties (counties in which liquor-by-the-drink was legal). This change was expected to lead to the establishment of small distilleries, thus increasing the number of producers of Tennessee whiskey. As of March 2013, there are five brands with at least one Tennessee whiskey on the market, and several with whiskey in the barrel awaiting release.

See also
 Dry county

References

External links
 Tennessee Alcoholic Beverage Commission
http://www.state.tn.us/abc/Permit%20Numbers%202%20-%20updated%2001252011.pdf
Tennessee: Municipalities and Counties allowing Liquor-by-the-Drink & retail package stores.

Tennessee
Government of Tennessee
 
Tennessee law